Rytis Vaišvila (born May 23, 1971) is a retired Lithuanian basketball player and current coach. He currently serves as head coach of BC Sūduva.

National team career
Vaišvila was a member of the Lithuanian national team which won bronze medals at the 1996 Olympic Games.

References

Living people
1971 births
Basketball players from Klaipėda
Basketball players at the 1996 Summer Olympics
Olympic basketball players of Lithuania
Lithuanian men's basketball players
Olympic bronze medalists for Lithuania
Lithuanian basketball coaches
LSU-Atletas basketball players
Olympic medalists in basketball
BC Neptūnas coaches
Medalists at the 1996 Summer Olympics
Szolnoki Olaj KK players
Shooting guards